Boyer's cuckooshrike (Coracina boyeri) is a species of bird in the family Campephagidae.
It is widely spread across New Guinea. Its natural habitats are subtropical or tropical moist lowland forests and subtropical or tropical mangrove forests.

The common name and Latin binomial commemorate the French explorer Joseph Emmanuel P. Boyer.

References

Boyer's cuckooshrike
Birds of New Guinea
Boyer's cuckooshrike
Boyer's cuckooshrike
Taxonomy articles created by Polbot